José Luis Granados Asprilla (born 22 October 1986 in Valera) is a Venezuelan footballer. He currently plays for Hermanos Colmenarez, as a defender.

External links 

1986 births
Living people
Venezuelan footballers
Venezuela international footballers
2011 Copa América players
Venezuelan Primera División players
Trujillanos FC players
Carabobo F.C. players
Deportivo Táchira F.C. players
Deportivo La Guaira players
Real Esppor Club players
Association football defenders
People from Valera
21st-century Venezuelan people